This article presents the discography of the jazz saxophonist and band leader Sonny Rollins.

Studio albums

Live albums

As sideman
With Miles Davis
Miles Davis and Horns (Prestige, 1951)
Dig (Prestige, 1951)
Collectors' Items (Prestige, 1953)
Bags' Groove (Prestige, 1954)
With Kenny Dorham
Jazz Contrasts (Riverside, 1957)
With Art Farmer
Early Art (New Jazz, 1954)
With Dizzy Gillespie
Duets (Verve, 1957)
Sonny Side Up (Verve, 1957) - with Sonny Stitt
With Babs Gonzales
Weird Lullaby (Blue Note/Capitol, 1949) 
With Ernie Henry
Last Chorus (Riverside, 1956)
With J. J. Johnson
J. J. Johnson's Jazz Quintets (Savoy, 1949 [1957]) – four tracks
Mad Be-Bop (Savoy, 1949 [1978]) – eight tracks (as above, plus alternate takes)
Trombone By Three (Prestige, 1949 [1956]) – album shared with Kai Winding and Bennie Green, original 78rpm issues under the New Jazz imprint
With Abbey Lincoln
That's Him! (Riverside, 1957)
With Modern Jazz Quartet
The Modern Jazz Quartet at Music Inn Volume 2 (Atlantic, 1958)
With Thelonious Monk
Monk (Prestige, 1954)
Thelonious Monk and Sonny Rollins (Prestige, 1956) – 10-inch issue released in 1953
Brilliant Corners (Riverside, 1957)
With Fats Navarro
The Fabulous Fats Navarro (Blue Note, 1949)
With Bud Powell
The Amazing Bud Powell (Blue Note, 1949)
With Max Roach
Clifford Brown and Max Roach at Basin Street (EmArcy, 1956) - with Clifford Brown
Max Roach + 4 (EmArcy, 1956)
Jazz in ¾ Time (EmArcy, 1956–57)
With The Rolling Stones
Tattoo You (Rolling Stones Records, 1981)
'With McCoy Tyner, Ron Carter, and Al Foster
 Milestone Jazzstars in Concert'' (Milestone, 1978)

References

External links
Sonny Rollins Discography Project accessed December 18, 2009

 
Jazz discographies
Discographies of American artists